Hyderabad Love Story is a 2018 Indian Telugu-language romantic comedy film directed by Raj Satya and starring Rahul Ravindran, Reshmi Menon and Jiya Shankar. The film was ready for release in 2015, but only released in 2018.

Cast 
Rahul Ravindran as Karthik
Reshmi Menon as Bhagyalakshmi
Jiya Shankar as Vaishnavi
Rao Ramesh as Gopal Rao
Sana as Karthik's mother
Surya as Karthik's father
Ambati
Rama Prabha
Shafi
Thagubothu Ramesh
Shankar Melkote
Dhanraj
Rachcha Ravi

Production 
The film was announced in late 2014, but got delayed in production.

Soundtrack 
The music was composed by Sunil Kashyap. The audio was released in January 2015.

Release and reception 
The film released on 23 February 2018. The New Indian Express wrote that "Raj Satya’s Hyderabad Love Story was just like a mess created by a teen". A critic from Asianet praised the story and performance of the lead cast while criticising the comedy sequences.

References

External links 

2010s Telugu-language films
Indian romantic comedy films
2018 romantic comedy films